The men's pole vault was a track & field athletics event at the 1900 Summer Olympics in Paris. It was held on July 15, 1900. Eight athletes from five nations competed in the pole vault.

This event was heavily protested by the United States team, as it was held on a Sunday and three of the top American vaulters had been told that they could vault on the following day and have the results count. The French organizers, however, ruled on July 14 that the results of Sunday competitions would be final. The American vaulters did not learn of that decision until after the event. The two that did compete were not regularly vaulters—Baxter had just finished winning the high jump when the pole vault began and decided to join the competition. He won, with teammate Meredith Colket finishing second. Carl Albert Andersen of Norway took bronze.

Background

This was the second appearance of the event, which is one of 12 athletics events to have been held at every Summer Olympics. The American team was heavily favored, though the ruling that the Sunday competition would be final eliminated top competitors Charles Dvorak, Dan Horton, and Bascom Johnson, who were unaware of the ruling and expected to compete the following day.

France, Hungary, Norway, and Sweden each made their first appearance in the event. The United States was the only nation to have pole vaulters at both the 1896 and 1900 Games.

Competition format

There was a single round of vaulting.

Records

These were the standing world and Olympic records (in metres) prior to the 1900 Summer Olympics.

* unofficial

Irving Baxter equalized the Olympic record with 3.30 metres.

Schedule

The Sunday schedule prevented some Americans from competing. Because the event was held immediately after the high jump, the high jump winner (Irving Baxter) decided to compete.

Results

Baxter, despite being a high jumper who had little experience in pole vaulting and having just finished the high jump competition, was the top vaulter. Along with the other medallists, he cleared 3.10 metres first, then 3.20 metres. Andersen could not clear 3.25 while both the Americans did. That was the highest vault that Colket could accomplish, however, and Baxter's 3.30 was enough to win.

References

Sources
 International Olympic Committee.
 De Wael, Herman. Herman's Full Olympians: "Athletics 1900". Accessed 18 March 2006.
 

Men's jumping pole vault
Pole vault at the Olympics